The Stubai Hohenweg or Stubai highroute is a high-level footpath approximately 120 km long, which can be done in 8 or 9 days. It is designed to be a circular route starting in Neustift, but can be started from elsewhere, for example Fulpmes. 

The path is by alpine and high alpine terrain, between 2000 and 3000 m. Some sections are secured by cable, but the route avoids glaciers.

Stages

References

External links 
 Detailed description of Stubai Hohenweg and related huts
 private website about Stubai Hohenweg (german)
 private website about Stubai Hohenweg (german)
 Stubai Hohenweg in Google Maps

Hiking trails in Austria